The Panama national beach soccer team represents Panama in international beach soccer competitions and is controlled by the Federación Panameña de Fútbol, the governing body for football in Panama.

Current squad

Achievements

CONCACAF Beach Soccer Championship

References

External links
Concacaf.com
Concacaf.com

North American national beach soccer teams
National sports teams of Panama